William Joseph Chambers (October 17, 1923 – September 29, 1983) was an American football offensive lineman in the All-America Football Conference. He played two seasons for the New York Yankees (1948–1949). He played collegiately for Alabama, Georgia Tech and UCLA.

References

1923 births
1983 deaths
Players of American football from Los Angeles
American football offensive tackles
Alabama Crimson Tide football players
Georgia Tech Yellow Jackets football players
UCLA Bruins football players
New York Yankees (AAFC) players